The Major Lied 'Til Dawn is a 1938 Warner Bros. Merrie Melodies cartoon directed by Frank Tashlin. The short was released on August 13, 1938.

The short was written by Rich Hogan and animated by Phil Monroe.

Synopsis 
A big game hunter, called "the Major", tells a little boy (a caricature of child actor Freddie Bartholomew) stories about hunting in Africa. On one hunt, the Major gets help from the African natives to catch animals, with funny results.  The cartoon is notable for its ending, in which an elephant says, "That's all, folks!", prompting a quick rendition of "Merrily We Roll Along" as the credits appear.  The elephant was voiced by Mel Blanc, who coincidentally also voiced Porky Pig, who also said "That's All Folks" at the end of each Looney Tunes cartoon at the time.

Voice cast 
 Mel Blanc as the Elephant
 Tedd Pierce as the Major
 Tommy Bond as the Young Boy

References

External links
 
 

1938 films
1938 animated films
Merrie Melodies short films
Warner Bros. Cartoons animated short films
Short films directed by Frank Tashlin
1930s American animated films
Films scored by Carl Stalling
Films about hunters
Films set in Africa
1930s English-language films